Todo (Everything) is the eighteenth studio album by Juan Gabriel, released in 1983. Todo received a nomination for a Grammy Award for Best Mexican/Mexican-American Album.

Track listing

References

External links

Juan Gabriel albums
1983 albums